Dunsink is a townland in the civil parish of Castleknock, Dublin, in Ireland.

The townland is the site of Dunsink Observatory, where William Rowan Hamilton and Hermann Brück were directors. Built in 1783–1785, it is the oldest scientific institution in Ireland. The observatory houses a 12-inch (30 cm) refracting telescope which was built by Grubbs of Dublin using a French manufactured lens. It is situated on a hill 8 km northwest of Dublin's city centre, where the astronomy section of the School of Cosmic Physics in the Dublin Institute for Advanced Studies is located.

The 1880 Definition of Time Act set the official time in Ireland to be Dublin Mean Time. This was computed as the time at Dunsink, which was about GMT-25m21. In 1916, another act moved Ireland to Greenwich Mean Time. Dunsink time is mentioned five times in James Joyce's novel, Ulysses.

Formerly the location of "Dublin’s biggest landfill facility", Dunsink is also the site of a major unofficial Traveller encampment, the subject of considerable media coverage in 2007. By 2008, Fingal County Council had reportedly compensated those in the encampment to "vacate [the] land".

References

Castleknock
Irish Traveller-related controversies
Townlands of the barony of Castleknock